The 2014–15 Premier League of Belize (also known as The Belikin Cup) was the fourth season of the highest competitive football league in Belize, after it was founded in 2011. There were two seasons which were spread over two years, the opening (which was played towards the end of 2014) and the closing (which was played at the beginning of 2015).

Teams

Opening season
All 7 teams that participated in the 2013–14 Premier League of Belize continued to play in the opening season of 2014–15, as well as the returning Placencia Texmar Assassins and the newly reformed Wagiya from Dangriga.

There would be one league consisting of the 9 teams, who will play each other once, with the top 4 teams advancing to the end of season playoffs. The opening season commenced on 19 October 2014.

The Round 8 game between FC Belize and Police United scheduled for 6 December 2014 was forfeited by FC Belize, giving the 3–0 victory to Police United.

The Round 9 game between FC Belize and Belmopan Bandits scheduled for 13 December 2014 was forfeited by FC Belize, giving the 3–0 victory to Belmopan Bandits.

League table

Results

Round 1

Round 2

Round 3

Round 4

Round 5

Round 6

Round 7

Round 8

Round 9

Opening season playoffs 

The playoffs will consist of the top four ranked teams from the regular season: Police United, Verdes FC, Belmopan Bandits and Belize Defence Force. The teams will play each other twice. The top two teams will qualify for the finals.

Playoffs table

Playoff results

Round 1

Round 2

Round 3

Round 4

Round 5

Round 6

Championship final series

Game one

Game two

Season statistics

Top scorers

(*) Please note playoff goals are included.

Hat tricks

 4 Player scored 4 goals

Awards
In the post-game ceremonies of the final game of the season, the individual awards were announced for the regular season.

Closing season
All 9 teams that participated in the opening season will participate in the closing season, with Paradise/Freedom Fighters being rebranded as King Energy/Freedom Fighters.

The format will be the same as the opening season with one league consisting of the 9 teams, who will play each other once, with the top 4 teams advancing to the end of season playoffs. The closing season will commence on 31 January 2015.

League table

Results

Round 1

Round 2

Round 3

Round 4

Round 5

Round 6

Round 7

Round 8

Round 9

Closing season playoffs 

The playoffs will consist of the top four ranked teams from the regular season: Police United, Verdes FC, Belmopan Bandits and Belize Defence Force. The teams will play each other twice. The top two teams will qualify for the finals.

Playoffs table

Playoff results

Round 1

Round 2

Round 3

Round 4

Round 5

Round 6

Championship final series

Game one

Game two

Season statistics

Top scorers

(*) Please note playoff goals are included.

Hat tricks

Awards

In the post-game ceremonies of the final game of the season, the individual awards were announced for the regular season.

Aggregate table
The champion with the best aggregate record qualifies for the 2015–16 CONCACAF Champions League.

References

Top level Belizean football league seasons
1
Bel